There are currently 24 county councils in England, covering areas known as non-metropolitan counties and divided into a number of non-metropolitan districts, which each have a district council. The first county councils were created in 1889. The Local Government Act 1888 established county councils and county borough councils in England and Wales. There was a significant reform of the number, powers and jurisdictions of county councils  in 1974. Their number has been decreasing further due to incremental reforms carried out between 1986 and 2021.

Current

Former

Footnotes
: 1st creation 1889—1965; 2nd creation 1974—present
: 1st creation 1889—1974; 2nd creation 1998—present
: Monmouthshire considered part of Wales from 1974.

See also

 Unitary authorities of England

References

Further reading 
 List of English County Councils with Contact Details & Opening Times

 
 
England-related lists